Jerome Bonaparte may refer to:

 Jérôme Bonaparte (1784–1860), King Jerome I of Westphalia, Prince of Montfort, Marshall of France, President of the French Senate
 Jérôme Napoléon Bonaparte (1805–1870), son of above, American farmer
 Jerome Napoleon Bonaparte II (1830–1893), American soldier, son of above
 Jerome Napoleon Charles Bonaparte (1878–1945), son of above
 Jérôme Napoléon Charles Bonaparte (1814–1847), Prince of Montfort
 Prince Jérôme Napoléon (1822–1891), son of above